Geeta Verma is an Indian politician and member of the National People's Party. She represents the Sikrai seat in Rajasthan Legislative Assembly.

References

1973 births
Women in Rajasthan politics
National People's Party (India) politicians from Rajasthan
Living people
Rajasthan MLAs 2013–2018
21st-century Indian women politicians
21st-century Indian politicians
Rajasthani politicians
Place of birth missing (living people)
Bharatiya Janata Party politicians from Rajasthan